Alison Phipps may refer to:
 Alison Phipps (sociologist), British political sociologist, gender studies scholar and feminist theorist
 Alison Phipps (refugee researcher), professor of refugee research, language and intercultural studies